The Fédération Québécoise des Municipalités (FQM) is an organization representing municipalities in the Canadian province of Quebec. Its stated purpose is to provide political and strategic leadership to represent the interests of local and regional municipalities.

Most municipalities in the FQM are smaller, rural communities from Quebec's regions.

See also
List of micro-regional organizations

References

Local government in Quebec
Local government organizations
Organizations based in Quebec